Richard "Ricky" Burke (born 7 July 1990) is a Scottish footballer who previously played in the United States for Richmond Kickers in the United Soccer League.

References

External links
 Kickers profile

1990 births
Living people
American soccer players
Livingston F.C. players
Northern Virginia Royals players
Richmond Kickers players
USL Championship players
USL League Two players
Association football midfielders